Jérôme Thiesson (born 6 August 1987) is a Swiss football coach and a former player. He is the manager of FC Mutschellen in the fifth-tier 2. Liga Interregional.

Career
In January 2011 Thiesson agreed to a contract to join FC Luzern as of summer 2011.

In February 2017 Thiesson agreed to a contract to join Minnesota United FC as of winter 2017. Thiesson was released by Minnesota at the end of their 2018 season.

In January 2019 Thiesson agreed to a contract to join FC Rapperswil-Jona for the remainder of the 2018-2019 season. However, already on 20 May 2019, FC Aarau announced that they had signed Thiesson from the upcoming 2019/20 season.

References

External links
 
 

1987 births
Living people
Swiss men's footballers
Switzerland under-21 international footballers
Association football defenders
FC Wil players
AC Bellinzona players
FC Luzern players
Minnesota United FC players
FC Rapperswil-Jona players
FC Aarau players
Swiss Super League players
Swiss Challenge League players
Major League Soccer players
Swiss football managers